Robert Henry Minton (July 13, 1904 – September 1974) is an American bobsledder who competed in the 1930s with a huge throw in. He won the bronze medal in the two-man event at the 1932 Winter Olympics in Lake Placid. He died in New York City.

References
Bobsleigh two-man Olympic medalists 1932-56 and since 1964
DatabaseOlympics.com profile

1904 births
1974 deaths
American male bobsledders
Bobsledders at the 1932 Winter Olympics
Olympic bronze medalists for the United States in bobsleigh
Medalists at the 1932 Winter Olympics